Pirita Convent was a monastery for both monks and nuns dedicated to St. Brigitta, located in the district of Pirita in Tallinn, Estonia. It functioned from 1407 to 1575. It was the largest convent in Livonia,  and one of the largest in Northern Europe.

History
The idea of founding the monastery dates to merchants (H. Huxer, G. Kruse, H. Swalbart) of Tallinn of around 1400.  In 1407, two monks from Vadstena Abbey arrived in Tallinn to counsel the merchants.  The first permit to break dolomite to gather building material for building the complex was acquired in 1417. The convent was constructed under the supervision of the architect Heinrich Swalbart.

The main church of the monastery was consecrated on 15 August 1436 by the Bishop of Tallinn Heinrich II.  Several of the merchants who had originally proposed the monastery later became its monks.  During its heyday, Pirita Convent became the largest Catholic monastery in Livonia.

The decline of the convent started after the adoption of the Protestant Reformation in Estonia in 1525, although it was allowed to continue to function. During the Livonian War in 1577, Pirita Convent was attacked by Russian troops under the leadership of Ivan the Terrible. They sacked the monastery, looted its riches and burned it down.  Pirita Convent was abandoned since then, but local people used adjacent lands as a cemetery.

See also

Vadstena Abbey
Bjärka-Säby Monastery
List of Christian religious houses in Estonia
New St. Bridget convent

References

Sources
 "Pirita klooster AD MMI-MMXI." Toimetus: Ema Riccarda, Lagle Parek, Vello Salo, Ilmo Au. Illustreeritud. – Tallinn, Pirita klooster 2001. 80 lk.

External links 
 
 Ermak Travel Site of Pirita Convent

Convents of the Catholic Church in Europe
Buildings and structures in Tallinn
Gothic architecture in Estonia
Ruins in Estonia
Roman Catholic monasteries in Estonia
Christian monasteries established in the 15th century
Bridgettine monasteries
Livonian Confederation
Tourist attractions in Tallinn
1577 disestablishments